The 2016 Angola Men's Handball League was the 37th edition, organized by the Federação Angolana de Andebol (Angolan Handball Federation). The tournament was held from June 14–25, 2016 in Luanda, contested by 7 teams and won by Clube Desportivo Primeiro de Agosto.

Participating teams

Squads

Preliminary rounds

Knockout stage

Fifth place match

Championship bracket

Semi-finals

Third place match

Final

Final standings

External links
 Results - cahbonline

References

Handball in Angola
Angola Men's Handball League
M